Nyssanthes is a genus of flowering plants belonging to the family Amaranthaceae.

Its native range is Eastern Australia.

Species:

Nyssanthes diffusa 
Nyssanthes erecta 
Nyssanthes impervia 
Nyssanthes longistyla

References

Amaranthaceae
Amaranthaceae genera